The Movement for Democracy and Progress may refer to:

Movement for Democracy and Progress (Comoros)
Movement for Democracy and Progress (Niger)
Movement for Democracy and Progress (Republic of the Congo)